James Lee Davis III (born September 3, 1983) is an American country/soul/Southern rock musician. He is best known as lead singer, guitarist, and principal songwriter of Jamie Davis & Soul Gravy, the band notable for its 2006 single "Mississippi Moonshine".

Personal life
He was born as James Lee Davis III in Tupelo, Mississippi, and grew up in Booneville. He is the eldest of three children born to Angela Cook Hughes and James "Jim" Davis, Jr. He attended  Northeast Community College and Mississippi State University, where he graduated with a Bachelor's degree in Business. Davis is a Republican, although he supported then-Congressman Travis Childers (D-MS) in 2008. He was married in October 2013 to Maria Davis and has two children.

Musical Career

Jamie Davis & Soul Gravy 
Davis and Dan Isbell, former member of Christian rock group Wavorly, founded Jamie Davis & Soul Gravy while attending Mississippi State University. The rotating band lineup solidified in 2005 with the addition of highly acclaimed Starkville-area musicians John Staggers (drums), Mitch Shurden (bass), and Jerry Carnathan (lead guitar). The band's current members are:
Jamie Davis, lead vocals, guitar
Jerry Carnathan, vocals, lead guitar
Lee Graham, bass
Dustin Nunley, vocals, acoustic guitar, banjo
John Staggers, drums

Former members:
Dustin Childers, current manager/booking agent, lead guitar until 2005
Dan Isbell, vocals, guitar until 2014
Josh Mallard, drums until 2005
Mitch Shurden, bass 2005-2009
Jason Herndon, bass until 2005

Songwriting 
In 2020, Davis co-wrote "My Kinda Folk" along with  Ray Fulcher, Dan Isbell, Dustin Nunley and Luke Combs.  The song was released on August 20, 2020 on the deluxe album, What You See Ain't Always What You Get.  On June 16, 2022, Luke Combs released "The Kind of Love We Make" written by Davis, Dan Isbell, Reid Isbell and Luke Combs.  The song debuted at number 18 on the Billboard County Airplay chart dated June 25, 2022.

Discography 
2006 - Mississippi Moonshine
2010 - The Blue Album
2015 - Jamie Davis & Soul Gravy (informally, The Green Album) produced by Mac McAnally

References

External links
Official site
"One More Song" music video on YouTube
"Louisiana" music video on YouTube
"Mississippi Moonshine" music video on YouTube

1983 births
Living people
American male singer-songwriters
People from Booneville, Mississippi
People from Alcorn County, Mississippi
Singer-songwriters from Mississippi
Blues musicians from Mississippi
Country musicians from Mississippi
American country singer-songwriters
American soul singers
American folk rock musicians
American Southern Rock musicians
Blues rock musicians
Mississippi State University alumni
Guitarists from Mississippi
American male guitarists
People from Tupelo, Mississippi
21st-century American singers
21st-century American guitarists
21st-century American male singers